Jordan Aaron Thompson (born 9 October 1996) is an English cricketer. He made his Twenty20 debut for Yorkshire in the 2018 T20 Blast on 15 July 2018. He made his List A debut on 6 May 2019, for Yorkshire in the 2019 Royal London One-Day Cup.

Thompson made his first-class debut on 10 June 2019, for Yorkshire in the 2019 County Championship match at Guildford against Surrey. In April 2022, he was bought by the London Spirit for the 2022 season of The Hundred.

References

External links
 

1996 births
Living people
English cricketers
Yorkshire cricketers
Cricketers from Leeds
Northern Superchargers cricketers
Hobart Hurricanes cricketers
Karachi Kings cricketers
London Spirit cricketers